The Bowling Writers Association of America (BWAA) annually selects a Male Bowler of the Year and a Female Bowler of the Year.

Dick Weber Male Bowler of the Year
 
1942: Johnny Cremins
1943: Ned Day
1944: Ned Day
1945: Buddy Bomar 
1946: Joe Wilman
1947: Buddy Bomar
1948: Andy Varipapa
1949: Connie Schwoegler
1950: Junie McMahon
1951: Lee Jouglard
1952: Steve Nagy
1953: Don Carter
1954: Don Carter
1955: Steve Nagy
1956: Bill Lillard
1957: Don Carter
1958: Don Carter
1959: Ed Lubanski
1960: Don Carter
1961: Dick Weber
1962: Don Carter
1963: Dick Weber
1964: Billy Hardwick
1965: Dick Weber
1966: Wayne Zahn
1967: Dave Davis
1968: Jim Stefanich
1969: Billy Hardwick
1970: Nelson Burton Jr.
1971: Don Johnson
1972: Don Johnson
1973: Don McCune
1974: Earl Anthony
1975: Earl Anthony
1976: Earl Anthony
1977: Mark Roth
1978: Mark Roth
1979: Mark Roth
1980: Wayne Webb
1981: Earl Anthony
1982: Earl Anthony
1983: Earl Anthony
1984: Mark Roth
1985: Mike Aulby
1986: Walter Ray Williams
1987: Marshall Holman
1988: Brian Voss
1989: Mike Aulby
1990: Amleto Monacelli
1991: David Ozio
1992: Marc McDowell
1993: Walter Ray Williams
1994: Norm Duke
1995: Mike Aulby
1996: Walter Ray Williams
1997: Walter Ray Williams
1998: Walter Ray Williams
1999: Parker Bohn III
2000: Norm Duke
2001: Parker Bohn III
2002: Walter Ray Williams
2003: Walter Ray Williams
2004: Walter Ray Williams
2005: Patrick Allen
2006: Tommy Jones
2007: Patrick Allen
2008: Norm Duke
2009: Norm Duke
2010: Bill O'Neill
2011: Mika Koivuniemi
2012: Mike Fagan

Female Bowler of the Year
 
1948: Val Mikiel
1949: Val Mikiel
1950: Marion Ladewig
1951: Marion Ladewig
1952: Marion Ladewig
1953: Marion Ladewig
1954: Marion Ladewig
1955: Sylvia Martin
1956: Anita Cantaline
1957: Marion Ladewig
1958: Marion Ladewig
1959: Marion Ladewig
1960: Sylvia Martin
1961: Shirley Garms
1962: Shirley Garms
1963: Marion Ladewig
1964: LaVerne Carter
1965: Betty Kuczynski
1966: Joy Abel
1967: Mildred Ignizio
1968: Dotty Fothergill
1969: Dotty Fothergill
1970: Mary Baker Harris
1971: Paula Carter
1972: Patty Costello
1973: Judy Soutar
1974: Betty Morris
1975: Judy Soutar
1976: Patty Costello
1977: Betty Morris
1978: Donna Adamek
1979: Donna Adamek
1980: Donna Adamek
1981: Donna Adamek 
1982: Nikki Gianulias
1983: Lisa Wagner
1984: Aleta Sill
1985: Aleta Sill
1986: Lisa Wagner
1987: Betty Morris
1988: Lisa Wagner
1989: Robin Romeo
1990: Tish Johnson
1991: Leanne Barrette
1992: Tish Johnson
1993: Lisa Wagner
1994: Anne Marie Duggan
1995: Tish Johnson
1996: Wendy Macpherson
1997: Wendy Macpherson
1998: Carol Gianotti-Block
1999: Wendy Macpherson
2000: Wendy Macpherson
2001: Carolyn Dorin-Ballard
2002: Leanne Barrette
2003: Carolyn Dorin-Ballard
2004: Shannon Pluhowsky
2005: Liz Johnson
2006: Kelly Kulick
2007: Liz Johnson
2008: Lynda Barnes
2009: Liz Johnson
2010: Kelly Kulick
2011: Shannon Pluhowsky
2012: Diandra Asbaty

External links
Bowlers of the Year

Ten-pin bowling-related lists